Special Troops Armory, also known as Philadelphia Armory, is a historic National Guard armory located in the Ogontz neighborhood of Philadelphia, Pennsylvania, United States.  It was built in 1938, and is an "I"-plan, brick building in the Moderne style. It consists of a two-story front section, two-story drill hall, and one-story rear section.  The front section is seven bays wide, with the center five bays slightly projecting. During World War II it was used to house German prisoners of war.  

It was added to the National Register of Historic Places in 1991.

As of 2014, it has been purchased by La Salle University

References

Armories on the National Register of Historic Places in Pennsylvania
Olney-Oak Lane, Philadelphia
Government buildings completed in 1938
Military installations established in 1938
Moderne architecture in Pennsylvania
Category:Military facilities on the National Register of Historic Places in Philadelphia, Pennsylvania